Our House is an Australian lifestyle and home renovation factual television series that aired on the Nine Network from 1993 until 2001. It was presented by musician and former Skyhooks band member front man Shirley Strachan, Reg Livermore, Rebecca Gilling, Tracey Dale (1993-1997), Suzie Wilks (1998-2000), Tara Dennis (2001) and Peter Harris. Strachan had previously fronted a children's TV program, Shirl's Neighbourhood.

On 29 August 2001, Strachan died in a helicopter accident. The final episode of Our House, a Christmas-themed special, paid tribute to Strachan.

In late 2001, Nine announced on their corporate site that they were planning to develop new episodes of Our House for broadcast in 2002. However, this did not materialize and the show did not return to air.

References

External links
IMDB

Nine Network original programming
Australian non-fiction television series
1993 Australian television series debuts
2001 Australian television series endings